Samar Nassar (born 16 February 1978) is a swimmer from Jordan. She was born in Lebanon, and competed for Palestine at the 2000 Summer Olympics, and for Jordan at the 2004 Summer Olympics. She was the first woman to represent Palestine at the Olympics.

Nassar also served as CEO of the FIFA U-17 Women's World Cup Local Organizing Committee that handled Jordan's hosting of the 2016 FIFA U-17 Women's World Cup.

References

1978 births
Living people
Palestinian female swimmers
Jordanian female swimmers
Olympic swimmers of Palestine
Olympic swimmers of Jordan
Swimmers at the 2000 Summer Olympics
Swimmers at the 2004 Summer Olympics
Olympic officials